The Bomb is a play by Kevin Dyer, focusing on the IRA Brighton bombing of 1984.

Plot
In 2000, Jo Berry, whose father was killed in the blast, met Patrick Magee, the man who planted the bomb. The Bomb is inspired by the events which led Jo and Patrick to meet and the impact those people had on each other.

It is sourced from interviews, research and actual and imagined dialogue. It is not a verbatim play, but is partly factual and describes real events.

The Bomb has twice toured nationally. The Bomb was nominated for two Theatrical Management Awards.

References

Plays based on actual events
Brighton in fiction
Plays set in England
Fiction set in 1984
History of East Sussex
2008 plays
Fiction set in 2000
British plays